Samnangerfjorden is a fjord in Vestland county, Norway. The head of the fjord is located in Samnanger, surrounded by the villages of Årland, Haga, and Tysse. The fjord flows to the southwest from there and eventually flows into the Fusafjorden (which later joins the large Bjørnafjorden). The fjord forms the southern boundary of the Bergen Peninsula.

See also
 List of Norwegian fjords

References

Fjords of Vestland
Bjørnafjorden
Samnanger